Year 984 (CMLXXXIV) was a leap year starting on Tuesday (link will display the full calendar) of the Julian calendar.

Events 
 By place 

 Europe 
 Spring – German boy-king Otto III (4-years old) is seized by the deposed Henry II (the Wrangler), duke of Bavaria, who has recovered his duchy and claims the regency as a member of the Ottonian Dynasty. But Henry is forced to hand over Otto to his mother, empress consort Theophanu.
 King Ramiro III loses his throne to Bermudo II (the rival king of Galicia), who also becomes ruler of the entire Kingdom of León (modern-day Spain).

 Japan 
 Fall – Emperor En'yū abdicates the throne in favor of his 16-year-old son Kazan after a 15-year reign. En'yū retires and becomes a Buddhist priest.

 By topic 

 Technology 
 Qiao Weiyue, a Chinese engineer, innovates the first known use of the double-gated canal pound lock during the Song Dynasty, for adjusting different water levels in segments of the Grand Canal in China.

 Religion 
 August 20 – Pope John XIV dies a prisoner in the Castel Sant'Angelo at Rome after a 1-year reign, having either been murdered or starved to death.
 Anti-Pope Boniface VII returns from Constantinople and gains support from the powerful Roman Crescentii family. He takes hold of the papal throne.

Births 
 Abu al-Qasim Muhammad, founder of the Abbadid Dynasty (d. 1042)
 Choe Chung, Korean Confucian scholar and poet (d. 1068)
 Emma, queen of England, Denmark and Norway (d. 1052, approximate date)

Deaths 
 July 7 – Crescentius (the Elder), politician and aristocrat
 July 18 – Dietrich I, bishop of Metz
 August 1 – Æthelwold, bishop of Winchester 
 August 20 – John XIV, pope of the Catholic Church
 September 9 – Warin, archbishop of Cologne
 Buluggin ibn Ziri, ruler (emir) of the Zirid Dynasty
 Domnall Claen, king of Leinster (Ireland)
 Edith of Wilton, English princess and abbess
 Eochaid Ua Floinn, Irish poet (approximate date)
 Gerberga, Frankish queen (approximate date)
 Jordan, bishop of Poland (or 982)
 Miró III, count of Cerdanya and Besalú (b. 920)
 Ragnhild Eriksdotter, Norse Viking noblewoman
 Shi Shouxin, Chinese general (b. 928)

References